Parliamentary elections were held in Uruguay in 1917. The Colorado Party (Batllistas) received almost half the vote, whilst other Colorado Party factions took a further quarter.

Results

References

Elections in Uruguay
Uruguay
Parliamentary